Penns railway station is a disused railway station which served the village of Walmley in Sutton Coldfield when it was in the historic county of Warwickshire, now the West Midlands.

The station was opened in 1879 and was located on the Midland Railway Company's Walsall - Water Orton Branch as the first station on the line after leaving their Birmingham to Derby line between Castle Bromwich and Water Orton. The line then developed into the Sutton Park Line.

In 1965, the station closed and was demolished the next year as part of the Beeching Axe, which had also resulted in all stations on the same line being closed. The line was retained for freight trains.

The only surviving feature of the railway station is Penns Lane Bridge which spans the railway line. The station's site is now taken up by a religious meeting-house and its car park.

References

 
 
  (for coordinates)

Disused railway stations in Birmingham, West Midlands
Sutton Coldfield
Railway stations in Great Britain opened in 1879
Railway stations in Great Britain closed in 1965
Beeching closures in England
Former Midland Railway stations
1879 establishments in England
1965 disestablishments in England